Politique africaine is a quarterly francophone academic journal that publishes articles and book reviews on current issues in African politics. It was established in 1981 and is published by Éditions Karthala in Paris, France.

External links 
 

Political science journals
African studies journals
Publications established in 1981
Quarterly journals
French-language journals